Huta Raja is a village in Ranto Baek district, Mandailing Natal Regency in North Sumatra province, Indonesia. Its population is 619.

Climate
Huta Raja has a tropical rainforest climate (Af) with heavy to very heavy rainfall year-round.

References

 Populated places in North Sumatra